This is a list of lighthouses in Kuwait.

Lighthouses

See also
 Lists of lighthouses and lightvessels

References

External links
 

Kuwait
Lighthouses
Lighthouses